Silverio Visacro is an engineer at the Universidade Federal de Minas Gerais (UFMG) in Belo Horizonte, Brazil. He was named a Fellow of the Institute of Electrical and Electronics Engineers (IEEE) in 2016 for his contributions to lightning protection.

References

Fellow Members of the IEEE
Brazilian engineers
Living people
Year of birth missing (living people)
Place of birth missing (living people)